CoRoT-4 (formerly known as CoRoT-Exo-4) is a yellow-white dwarf main-sequence star in the constellation Monoceros.

Planetary system
The star is orbited by one known extrasolar planet, designated CoRoT-4b. It was catalogued as part of the CoRoT mission to find transiting planets, when a planet was spotted using the transit method.

See also
 List of extrasolar planets

References

External links
 

Monoceros (constellation)
F-type main-sequence stars
Planetary transit variables
Planetary systems with one confirmed planet